Pomaderris phylicifolia, commonly known as narrow-leaf pomaderris, is a species of flowering plant in the family Rhamnaceae and is to south-eastern Australia and New Zealand. It is a slender shrub with hairy stems, narrowly egg-shaped to linear leaves , and small clusters of cream-coloured to yellow flowers.

Description
The upper surface of the leaves has a few bristly hairs, the lower surface with woolly, simple and star-shaped hairs. The fruit is a hairy capsule.

Taxonomy
Pomaderris phylicifolia was first formally described in 1821 by Johann Heinrich Friedrich Link in his book Enumeratio Plantarum Horti Regii Berolinensis Altera from an unpublished description by the Loddiges family.

In 1997, Neville Grant Walsh and Fiona Coates described two subspecies of P. phylicifolia and the names are accepted by the Australian Plant Census:

Distribution and habitat
Both subspecies of narrow-leaf pomaderris are found in eastern New South Wales, eastern Victoria, and in Tasmania. Subspecies phylicifolia is also found in New Zealand. Subspecies ericoides occurs in south-eastern New South Wales and tends to occur at higher altitudes in woodland and shrubland, often near watercourses or swamps.

References

Flora of New South Wales
Flora of Victoria (Australia)
Flora of the Australian Capital Territory
Flora of Tasmania
Flora of New Zealand
phylicifolia
Plants described in 1821
Taxa named by Johann Heinrich Friedrich Link